Lyclene uncalis is a moth of the subfamily Arctiinae. It was described by Jagbir Singh Kirti and Navneet Singh Gill in 2009. It is found in the Indian states of Karnataka, Tamil Nadu and Kerala.

References

Nudariina
Moths described in 2009
Moths of Asia